The Flygsystem 2020 ("Flight System 2020", abbreviated FS 2020) is an ongoing project by the Swedish Air Force to develop a fifth-generation low-observable fighter jet by 2035. Little public information exists about the project; there are no official statements about the current stage of development, although a video claims to show a miniature prototype test. In 2012, Lieutenant Colonel Lars Helmrich of the Swedish Air Force asked members of the Riksdag to consider the development of a new jet fighter or to upgrade all present JAS 39 multirole fighters to the NG model, claiming the early versions of the aircraft will be obsolete by 2020.

The Saab/Linköping University Generic Future Fighter project is a testbed for its technologies.

Partnership
During a State visit of the  President of Turkey to Sweden on the 13th of March 2013, Türk Havacılık ve Uzay Sanayii AŞ (Turkish Aerospace Industries, TAI) signed an agreement with Sweden's Saab to provide design support services to Turkey for the TAI TFX program.

However, the project is under pressure, due to Turkey's possible end of participation in the Joint Strike Fighter program. To tackle this, it was reported in July 2019 that the Swedish government was about to join the British BAE Systems Tempest stealth sixth-generation fighter program; the goal for Sweden is to repose on the British Tempest program to integrate some of its technology to its own Flygsystem 2020.

References

Proposed aircraft of Sweden
Stealth aircraft
Swedish Air Force